The 2021 FIM Ice Speedway World Championship was the 56th edition of the FIM Individual Ice Racing World Championship season. Due to the continuing issues regarding the COVID-19 pandemic it was decided to hold a two-day final at the Anatoly Stepanov Stadium in Tolyatti, Russia, on 13 and 14 February 2021.

Dinar Valeev of Russia won the World Championship series to become world champion for the first time. Valeev defeated Igor Kononov in a race off after both riders finished on 36 points.

Russian athletes competed as neutral competitors using the designation MFR (Motorcycle Federation of Russia), as the Court of Arbitration for Sport upheld a ban on Russia competing at World Championships. The ban was implemented by the World Anti-Doping Agency in response to state-sponsored doping program of Russian athletes.

Final Series

Classification

See also 
2021 Ice Speedway of Nations

References 

Ice speedway competitions
World